The Container Security Initiative (CSI) a.k.a. the 24-Hour Rule was launched in 2002 by the U.S. Bureau of Customs and Border Protection (CBP), an agency of the Department of Homeland Security. Its purpose was to increase security for container cargo shipped to the United States. As the CBP puts it, the intent is to "extend [the] zone of security outward so that American borders are the last line of defense, not the first."

Rationale
Containerized shipping is a critical component of international trade. According to the CBP:

 About 90% of the world's trade is transported in cargo containers.
 Almost half of incoming U.S. trade (by value) arrives by containers on board ships.
 Nearly seven million cargo containers arrive on ships and are offloaded at U.S. seaports each year.

As terrorist organizations have increasingly turned to destroying economic infrastructure to make an impact on nations, the vulnerability of international shipping has come under scrutiny. Under the CSI program, the screening of containers that pose a risk for terrorism is accomplished by teams of CBP officials deployed to work in concert with their host nation counterparts.

CSI core elements

CSI consists of four core elements:

 Using intelligence and automated information to identify and target containers that pose a risk for terrorism.
 Pre-screening those containers that pose a risk at the port of departure before they arrive at U.S. ports.
 Using detection technology to quickly pre-screen containers that pose a risk.
 Using smarter, tamper-evident containers.

The initial CSI program has focused on implementation at the top 20 ports shipping approximately two-thirds of the container volume to the United States. Smaller ports, however, have been added to the program at their instigation, and participation is open to any port meeting certain volume, equipment, procedural, and information-sharing requirements. Future plans include expansion to additional ports based on volume, location, and strategic concerns.

Much of the original idea behind the CSI program stemmed from the work of James Giermanski, who was an early proponent of Supply Chain Security.

Global impact
The CSI program offers its participant countries the reciprocal opportunity to enhance their own incoming shipment security. CSI partners can send their customs officers to major U.S. ports to target ocean-going, containerized cargo to be exported from the U.S. to their countries. Likewise, CBP shares information on a bilateral basis with its CSI partners. Japan and Canada are currently taking advantage of this reciprocity.

CSI has also inspired and informed global measures to improve shipping security. In June 2002, the World Customs Organization unanimously passed a resolution that will enable ports in all 161 of the member nations to begin to develop programs along the CSI model. On 22 April 2004, the European Union and the U.S. Department of Homeland Security signed an agreement that calls for the prompt expansion of CSI throughout the European Community.

Participating ports

U.S. ports 

 NOTE: Information is needed here on ports participating in reciprocal agreements.

Foreign ports 

47 foreign CSI ports are operational as of 2006-09-29. They include:

 Halifax, Montreal, and Vancouver, Canada (March 2002)
 Rotterdam, The Netherlands (2002-09-02)
 Le Havre, France (2002-12-02)
 Marseille, France (2005-01-07)
 Bremerhaven, Germany (2003-02-02)
 Hamburg, Germany (2003-02-09)
 Antwerp, Belgium (2003-02-23)
 Zeebrugge, Belgium (2004-10-29)
 Singapore (2003-03-10)
 Yokohama, Japan (2003-03-24)
 Tokyo, Japan (2004-05-21)
 Hong Kong, China (2003-05-05)
 Gothenburg, Sweden (2003-05-23)
 Felixstowe, United Kingdom (UK) (2003-05-24)
 Liverpool, Thamesport, Tilbury, and Southampton, UK. (2004-11-01)
 Genoa, Italy (2003-06-16)
 La Spezia, Italy (2003-06-23)
 Livorno, Italy (2004-12-30)
 Naples, Italy (2004-09-30)
 Gioia Tauro, Italy (2004-10-31)
 Pusan, Korea (2003-08-04)
 Durban, South Africa (2003-12-01)
 Port Klang, Malaysia (2004-03-08)
 Tanjung Pelepas, Malaysia (2004-08-16)
 Piraeus, Greece (2004-07-27)
 Algeciras, Spain (2004-07-30)
 Nagoya and Kobe, Japan (2004-08-06)
 Laem Chabang, Thailand (2004-08-13)
 Dubai, United Arab Emirates (UAE) (2005-03-26)
 Shanghai, China (2005-04-28)
 Shenzhen, China (2005-06-24)
 Kaohsiung, Republic of China (Taiwan) (2005-07-25)
 Santos, Brazil (2005-09-22)
 Colombo, Sri Lanka (2005-09-29)
 Buenos Aires, Argentina (2005-11-17)
 Lisbon, Portugal (2005-12-14)
 Port Salalah, Oman (2006-03-08)
 Puerto Cortes, Honduras (2006-03-25)
 Caucedo, Dominican Republic (2006)
 Kingston, Jamaica (2006)
 Freeport, Bahamas (2006)

There are currently 58 foreign ports participating in the Container Security Initiative, accounting for 85 percent of container traffic bound for the United States, according to the U.S. Department of Homeland Security.

Currently Operational Ports

In the Americas

Montreal, Vancouver, and Halifax, Canada (March 2002)
Santos, Brazil
Buenos Aires, Argentina
Puerto Cortes*, Honduras
Caucedo, Dominican Republic
Kingston, Jamaica
Freeport, The Bahamas
Balboa, Colon, and Manzanillo, Panama
Cartagena, Colombia

In Europe:

Rotterdam, The Netherlands (2002-09-02)
Bremerhaven and Hamburg, Germany
Antwerp and Zeebrugge, Belgium
Le Havre and Marseille, France
Gothenburg, Sweden
La Spezia, Genoa, Naples, Gioia Tauro, and Livorno, Italy
Felixstowe, Liverpool, Thamesport, Tilbury, and Southampton, United Kingdom (U.K.)
Piraeus, Greece
Algeciras, Barcelona, and Valencia, Spain
Lisbon, Portugal

In Asia and the Middle East

Singapore*
Yokohama, Tokyo, Nagoya, and Kōbe, Japan
Hong Kong
Busan* (Pusan), South Korea
Port Klang and Tanjung Pelepas, Malaysia
Laem Chabang, Thailand
Dubai, United Arab Emirates (UAE)
Shenzhen and Shanghai
Kaohsiung and Chi-Lung
Colombo, Sri Lanka
Port Salalah*, Oman
Port Qasim, Pakistan
Ashdod, Israel
Haifa, Israel

In Africa:

Alexandria, Egypt
Durban, South Africa

See also

 Supply Chain Security
 List of seaports
 Port security
 SAFE Port Act 2006 (H.R. 4954)
 Ship transport
 Global Trade Exchange
 Denise Krepp
 James Giermanski

Notes

External links
 European Commission: Taxation and Customs Union - Security cooperation with third countries
 U.S. D.H.S.: Container Security Initiative
 World Customs Organization
 American Association of Port Authorities

This article incorporates text from the U.S. Bureau of Customs and Border Protection's pages and documents on the Container Security Initiative, modified for a more global perspective.

International security
United States and weapons of mass destruction
United States Department of Homeland Security
Intermodal containers